The  Maggie Lee  is a Chesapeake Bay skipjack, built in 1903 at Pocomoke City, Maryland. She is a 51' long two-sail bateau, or "V"-bottomed deadrise type of centerboard sloop. She has a beam of 16', a depth of 3.8', and a net tonnage of 8 register tons. She is one of the 35 surviving traditional Chesapeake Bay skipjacks and a member of the last commercial sailing fleet in the United States. She is located at Denton, Caroline County, Maryland.

She was listed on the National Register of Historic Places in 1985. She is assigned Maryland dredge number 9.

References

External links
, including photo in 1983, at Maryland Historical Trust

Ships in Talbot County, Maryland
Skipjacks
Ships on the National Register of Historic Places in Maryland
1903 ships
National Register of Historic Places in Talbot County, Maryland